HMS Vulture was a Clydebank three funnel - 30 knot destroyer ordered by the Royal Navy under the 1895 – 1896 Naval Estimates.  She was the fifth ship to carry this name since it was introduced in 1776 for a 14-gun sloop sold until 1802.

Construction and career
She was laid down as Yard Number 291 on 26 November 1895 at J & G Thompson shipyard in Clydebank.  Her hull was lengthened to 222 feet and launched on 22 March 1898.  During her builder's trials she made her contract speed of 30 knots.  In 1899 during the construction of these ships, steelmaker John Brown and Company of Sheffield bought J&G Thomson's Clydebank yard for £923,255 3s 3d.  She was completed and accepted by the Royal Navy in May 1900.  She was the last to be laid down but the first accepted in this group. After commissioning she was assigned to the Chatham Division of the Harwich Flotilla.  She was deployed in Home waters for her entire service life.

On 30 August 1912 the Admiralty directed all destroyer classes were to be designated by alpha characters starting with the letter 'A'.  Since her design speed was 30-knots and she had three funnels she was assigned to the C Class.  After 30 September 1913, she was known as a C Class destroyer and had the letter ‘C’ painted on the hull below the bridge area and on either the fore or aft funnel.

World War I
In 1914 she was undergoing refit at the Nore based at Sheerness tendered to HMS Actaeon, a Royal Navy training establishment.  With the outbreak of hostilities in August 1914 she was assigned to the Nore Local Flotilla.  Her duties included anti-submarine and counter mining patrols in the Thames Estuary.  She remained in this employment for the duration of the war.

In 1919 she was paid off and laid-up in reserve awaiting disposal.   She was sold on 27 May 1919 to Hayes of Porthcawl for breaking.

Pennant Numbers

References
NOTE:  All tabular data under General Characteristics only from the listed Jane's Fighting Ships volume unless otherwise specified

Bibliography

External links
 http://www.gwpda.org/naval/s0420000.htm

 

Ships built on the River Clyde
1898 ships
C-class destroyers (1913)
World War I destroyers of the United Kingdom